The African Centre of Meteorological Application for Development (shortened as ACMAD) is an African weather office based in Niamey, Niger.

It was established in 1987 by UNECA and WMO. It has 53 member countries and cooperates with WMO, EUMETSAT and ECMWF.

References

Climate of Africa
Organizations established in 1987
Niamey